The 1887 Orange Athletic Club football team was an American football team that represented the Orange Athletic Club during the 1887 college football season. The team played its home games at the Grove Street grounds in East Orange, New Jersey, and compiled a 0–1 record in their first season of football.

Schedule

References

Orange Athletic Club
Orange Athletic Club football seasons
Orange Athletic Club football